Patricio Achurra Garfias (born Santiago, February 3, 1943) is Chilean actor and politician. Recognized for his roles in telenovelas such as J.J. Judge, La Colorina, La madrastra, and series such as Martín Rivas, among many others.

He was mayor of Paine from 2004 to 2008, backed by his party, the Christian Democratic Party. In 2012 he was elected councilor of the commune of Paine during the period 2012 to 2016.

His son is the actor Ignacio Achurra.

Filmography

Telenovelas

TV Series

References 

1943 births
Living people
Chilean television actors
Chilean film actors
People from Santiago
Actors from Santiago
20th-century Chilean actors
21st-century Chilean actors
Chilean politicians
Chilean actor-politicians